The term external memory is used with different meanings in different fields:
For the use of the term in psychology, see external memory (psychology)
For the use of the term in computing, see auxiliary memory
For the use of the term in computer science, see external memory algorithm